Podocnemis is a genus of aquatic turtles, commonly known as South American river turtles, in the family Podocnemididae. The genus consists of six extant species occurring in tropical South America. Three additional species are known only from fossils.

Species
These six species are extant.
Podocnemis erythrocephala  – red-headed Amazon River turtle
Podocnemis expansa  – Arrau turtle
Podocnemis lewyana  – Magdalena River turtle
Podocnemis sextuberculata  – six-tubercled Amazon River turtle
Podocnemis unifilis  – yellow-spotted river turtle, yellow-headed sideneck
Podocnemis vogli  – savanna side-necked turtle

Nota bene: A binomial authority in parentheses indicates that the species was originally described in a genus other than Podocnemis.

Fossil species
The following four species are extinct, all from late Neogene deposits in South America:
Podocnemis bassleri †
Podocnemis medemi †
 Podocnemis pritchardi †
 Podocnemis tatacoensis †Cadena & Vanegas, 2023.

The Late Cretaceous (Cenomanian) species "Podocnemis" parva Haas, 1978, based on remains from the West Bank, is now assigned to Algorachelus, as A. parvus.

References

Further reading
Boulenger GA (1889). Catalogue of the Chelonians, Rhynchocephalians, and Crocodiles in the British Museum (Natural History). New Edition. London: Trustees of the British Museum (Natural History). (Taylor and Francis, printers). x + 311 pp. + Plates I-III. (Genus Podocnemis, pp. 200–201, Figures 50–51).
Goin CJ, Goin OB, Zug GR (1978). Introduction to Herpetology, Third Edition. San Francisco: W.H. Freeman and Company. xi + 378 pp. . (Podocnemis, pp. 149, 271–272).
Wagler J (1830). Natürliches System der AMPHIBIEN, mit vorangehender Classification der SÄUGTHIERE und VÖGEL. Ein Beitrag zur vergleichenden Zoologie. Munich, Stuttgart and Tübingen: J.G. Cotta. vi + 354 pp. + one plate. (Podocnemis, new genus, p. 135). (in German and Latin).

 
Turtle genera
Turtles of South America
Taxa named by Johann Georg Wagler